HD 152082 is an A-type shell star in the southern constellation of Ara. This is a double star with a thirteenth magnitude companion at an angular separation of 6.8″ along a position angle of 329° (as of 2000).

References

External links
 HR 6253
 Image HD 152082

Ara (constellation)
152082
Double stars
A-type giants
6253
082806
Durchmusterung objects